The women's volleyball tournament at the 2011 Pan Arab Games was held in Doha, Qatar from December 10 to 21, 2011. In this women's 5 teams participated.

Rosters

Final round

Final standing

References

2011
2011 in volleyball